Independence Community School District is a public school district headquartered in Independence, Iowa. The district is mostly in Buchanan County, with a small area in Benton County, and serves the city of Independence and surrounding areas including the towns of Brandon and Rowley.

Russell Reiter was hired as superintendent in 2018.

Schools
The district operate four schools, all in Independence:
 Early Childhood Center
 East Elementary School
 West Elementary School
 Independence Junior-Senior High School

Independence High School

Athletics
The Mustangs compete in the WaMaC Conference in the following sports:

Baseball
Basketball (boys and girls)
Bowling
Cross Country (boys and girls)
Football
Golf (boys and girls)
 Boys' State Champions - 1964
Soccer (boys and girls)
Softball
Swimming (boys and girls)
Tennis (boys and girls)
Track and Field (boys and girls)
Volleyball
Wrestling
 Class 2A State Champions - 1996

See also
List of school districts in Iowa
List of high schools in Iowa

References

External links
 Independence Community School District

School districts in Iowa
Education in Benton County, Iowa
Education in Buchanan County, Iowa
Schools in Buchanan County, Iowa